Jindong Township is a township under the administration of Liangdang County, Gansu, China. , it administers the following 18 villages:
Liqu Village
Xinchao Village
Yuanjiagou Village
Miaoping Village
Wuyi Village
Guangou Village
Datan Village
Lijia Village
Hejiagou Village
Dashi Village
Tianba Village
Hualin Village
Huoshenmiao Village
Taiyang Village
Renwan Village
Qianchuan Village
Yangping Village
Sihe Village

References 

Township-level divisions of Gansu
Liangdang County